Voice acting is the art of performing voice-overs to present a character or provide information to an audience. Performers are called voice actors/actresses, voice artists, dubbing artists, voice talent, voice-over artists, or voice-over talent. Voice acting is recognised as a specialized dramatic profession in the United Kingdom, primarily due to BBC broadcasts of radio drama production.

Examples of voice work include animated, off-stage, off-screen or non-visible characters in various works such as feature films, dubbed foreign-language films, animated films, anime, television shows, video games, cartoons, documentaries, commercials, audiobooks, radio dramas and comedies, amusement rides, theater productions, puppet shows and audio games. Voice actors are also heard through pre-recorded and automated announcements that are a part of everyday modern life in areas such as shops, elevators, waiting rooms and public transport. The role of a voice actor may involve singing, most often when playing a fictional character, although a separate performer is sometimes enlisted as the character's singing voice.

History

Types

Character voices
The voices for animated characters are provided by voice actors. For live-action productions, voice acting often involves reading the parts of computer programs, radio dispatchers or other characters who never actually appear on screen. With an audio drama, there is more freedom because there is no need to match a dub to the original actor or animated character. Producers and agencies are often on the lookout for many styles of voices, such as booming voices for more dramatic productions or cute, young-sounding voices for trendier markets. Some voices sound like regular, natural, everyday people; all of these voices have their place in the voiceover world, provided they are used correctly and in the right context.

Narration
In the context of voice acting, narration is the use of spoken commentary to convey a story to an audience. A narrator is a personal character or a non-personal voice that the creator of the story develops to deliver information about the plot to the audience. The voice actor who plays the narrator is responsible for performing the scripted lines assigned to them. In traditional literary narratives (such as novels, short stories, and memoirs) narration is a required story element; in other types of (chiefly non-literary) narratives (such as plays, television shows, video games, and films) narration is optional.

Commercial 
One of the most common uses for voice acting is within commercial advertising. The voice actor is hired to voice a message associated with the advertisement. This has different sub-genres such as television, radio, film, and online advertising. The sub-genres are all different styles in their own right. For example, television commercials tend to be voiced with a narrow, flat inflection pattern (or prosody pattern) whereas radio commercials, especially local ones, tend to be voiced with a very wide inflection pattern in an almost over-the-top style. Marketers and advertisers use voice-overs in radio, TV, online adverts, and more; total advertising spend in the UK was forecast to be £21.8 billion in 2017. Voice-over used in commercial adverts is also the only area of voice acting where "de-breathing" is used. This means artificially removing breaths from the recorded voice, and is done to stop the audience being distracted in any way from the commercial message that is being put across.

Translation
Dub localization is the practice of voice-over translation, in which voice actors alter a foreign-language film or television series. Voice-over translation is an audiovisual translation technique, in which, unlike in Dub localization, actor voices are recorded over the original audio track, which can be heard in the background. This method of translation is most often used in documentaries and news reports to translate words of foreign-language interviewees.

Automated dialogue replacement

Automated dialogue replacement (ADR) is the process of re-recording dialogue by the original actor after the filming process to improve audio quality or reflect dialogue changes, also known as "looping" or a "looping session". ADR is also used to change original lines recorded on set to clarify context, improve diction or timing, or to replace an accented vocal performance. In the UK, it is also called "post-synchronization" or "post-sync".

Automated announcements
Voice artists are also used to record the individual sample fragments played back by a computer in an automated announcement. At its simplest, each recording consists of a short phrase which is played back when necessary, such as the "mind the gap" announcement introduced on the London Underground in 1969, which is currently voiced by Emma Clarke. In a more complicated system, such as a speaking clock, the announcement is re-assembled from fragments such as "minutes past", "eighteen", and "p.m." For example, the word "twelve" can be used for both "Twelve O'Clock" and "Six Twelve". Automated announcements can also include on-hold messages on phone systems and location-specific announcements in tourist attractions.

AI-generated and AI-modified voices 
Software to modify and generate human voices has become popular in the 21st century. AI startup Dessa created a computer-generated Joe Rogan's voice using thousands of hours of his podcast audio, while Ubisoft used speech synthesis to give thousands of characters distinguished voices in the video game Watch Dogs: Legion, and Google announced in 2020 their solution to generate human-like speech from text.

Voice acting by country

United States

In movie trailers and television and radio commercials, voice actors are often recruited through voice acting agencies. Mel Blanc, June Foray, Daws Butler, Don Messick, Phil Harris, Paul Winchell, Dan Castellaneta, Bill Farmer, Jim Cummings, Frank Welker, Mary Kay Bergman, Billy West, Jeff Bennett, Dee Bradley Baker, Grey DeLisle, Rob Paulsen, Tress MacNeille, Jason Marsden, Jessica DiCicco, Pamela Adlon, Kath Soucie, Debi Derryberry, Alan Tudyk, Tara Strong, Phil Lamarr, Tom Kenny, Nancy Cartwright, Jeff Bergman, Fred Tatasciore, Kate Higgins, Jennifer Hale, John DiMaggio, Steve Blum, Troy Baker, Mark Hamill, Kevin Conroy, Charles Martinet, Eric Bauza, Lauren Tom, and others have made careers in this field.

United Kingdom
The UK banned broadcasting of the voices of people linked to violence in Northern Ireland from 1988 to 1994, but television producers circumvented this by simply having voice actors dub over synchronized footage of the people who had been banned.

Japan

 occupations include performing roles in anime, audio dramas, and video games; performing voice-overs for dubs of non-Japanese movies; and providing narration to documentaries and similar programs. Japan has approximately 130 voice acting schools and troupes of voice actors who usually work for a specific broadcast company or talent agency. They often attract their own appreciators and fans, who watch shows specifically to hear their favorite performer. Many Japanese voice actors frequently branch into music, often singing the opening or closing themes of shows in which they star, or become involved in non-animated side projects such as audio dramas (involving the same characters in new storylines) or image songs (songs sung in character that are not included in the anime but which further develop the character).

Brazil
Most of the films in the theaters are dubbed in Portuguese, and most Brazilians tend to prefer watching movies in their native language. Many voice actors are also dubbing directors and translators. To become a voice actor in Brazil, one needs to be a professional actor and attend dubbing courses. Some celebrities in Brazil have also done voice acting.

Iran
Voice acting in Iran is divided into three categories.  Voice over Persian films, voice over Iranian animations, and dubbing of films and animations related to other countries (in non-Persian language)
In the first category, due to the lack of facilities for simultaneous recording of sound while filming a film, the voice actors spoke instead of the film actors.  Although this type of voice is related to years ago and now with the increase of facilities, it is possible to record the voice of the actors at the same time, but even today, sometimes the voice of the voice actors is used instead of the main actor.
The tail of the voice is on Iranian animations, and like in other parts of the world, voice actors speak instead of animated characters.
But most of the activities of Iranian voice actors are in the field of dubbing foreign films.  In this case, the main language of the film is translated into Persian, and the dubbing director compiles the sentences according to the atmosphere of the film and the movement of the actors 'mouths and other such cases, and finally the voice actors play roles instead of the actors' voices.

Voice acting in video games

Actors often lend their voices to characters in games and some have made a career of it across many of the main game-manufacturing countries, mostly the United States, Canada, the United Kingdom, and Japan. Their names have sometimes been linked to a particular character they have voiced.

Notable video game voice actors include Maaya Sakamoto (the Japanese version of Lightning in Final Fantasy XIII), Tatsuhisa Suzuki (Noctis Lucis Caelum in Final Fantasy XV), Miyu Irino (the Japanese version of Sora in the Kingdom Hearts series), David Hayter (Solid Snake and Big Boss in the Metal Gear series), Steve Downes and Jen Taylor (Master Chief and Cortana in the Halo series), Nolan North (Nathan Drake in the Uncharted series and Desmond Miles in the Assassin's Creed series), Troy Baker (Joel in The Last of Us series) and Charles Martinet (Mario, Luigi, Wario, and Waluigi in Nintendo's Mario franchise).

Other actors more linked with film or television acting have also voiced video game characters, such as Ray Liotta (Tommy Vercetti in Grand Theft Auto: Vice City and Billy Handsome in Call of Duty: Black Ops II), Michael Dorn (various characters in World of Warcraft and Gatatog Uvenk in Mass Effect 2), Kaili Vernoff (Miranda Cowan in Grand Theft Auto V and Susan Grimshaw in Red Dead Redemption 2), Ashley Johnson (Ellie in The Last of Us series), Kristen Bell (Lucy Stillman in the first three mainline entries in the Assassin's Creed franchise) and Kevin Spacey (Jonathan Irons in Call of Duty: Advanced Warfare).

See also
 National Audio Theatre Festival
 Adventures in Voice Acting
 The Magic Behind the Voices
 I Know That Voice
 Voice over
 Dubbing (filmmaking)

References

 
Voice actors
Acting
Entertainment occupations